Amerila luteibarba is a species of moth of the subfamily Arctiinae. It was described by George Hampson in 1901. It is found in Angola, Benin, Cameroon, the Democratic Republic of the Congo, Gabon, Ghana, Ivory Coast, Kenya, Liberia, Nigeria, Rwanda, Sierra Leone, Tanzania, Togo and Uganda.

References

 , 1901: Catalogue of the Arctiadae (Arctianae) and Agaristidae in the collection of the British Museum (Natural History). Catalogue of the Lepidoptera Phalaenae in the collection of the British Museum (Natural History) 3: XII+609 p., pl. 36-54, London.
 , 1997: A revision of the Afrotropical taxa of the genus Amerila Walker (Lepidoptera, Arctiidae). Systematic Entomology 22 (1): 1-44.

Moths described in 1901
Amerilini
Moths of Africa